Sterling Edmund Lanier (December 18, 1927 – June 28, 2007) was an American editor, science fiction author and sculptor. He is perhaps known best as the editor who championed the publication of Frank Herbert’s bestselling novel Dune.

Life
Lanier was born on December 18, 1927 in New York City to Priscilla Thorne Taylor and Berwick Bruce Lanier. He was trained as an anthropologist and archaeologist, and educated at Harvard, from which he graduated during 1951. He was a lifelong devotee of speculative fiction, as well as a cryptozoology enthusiast. Before beginning his literary career Lanier worked as a research historian at the Winterthur Museum from 1958 to 1960. He died in Sarasota, Florida, at the age of 79.

Literary career
Lanier's career as an author and editor began during 1961, when his first short story was published and he became an editor for Chilton Books.

He was with Chilton in 1965, when he was instrumental in persuading the firm to publish Frank Herbert’s Dune. Having read Dune World in Analog magazine, he was responsible for tracking down the author and conveying Chilton's offer. More than twenty other publishing companies had already turned the book down.  Despite Lanier's brilliant insight on the worth of the book, he was dismissed from Chilton a year later because of high publication costs and poor initial book sales. Lanier also worked as an editor for the John C. Winston Company and McRae-Smith.

The most prominent of Lanier's own writings are his stories of the crypto-adventurer Brigadier Donald Ffellowes (told in the "club story" style of Lord Dunsany's Jorkens tales), and the post-apocalyptic novels Hiero's Journey (1973) and The Unforsaken Hiero (1983). His short story "A Father's Tale" (1974) was a World Fantasy Award nominee. His major works including Hiero's Journey, The Unforsaken Hiero, and the Brigadier Ffellowes stories are now available in an electronic version for Kindle.

Sculpture
Lanier’s sculptures have been exhibited at a number of museums, including the Smithsonian Institution. He specialized in miniatures, among which were a series featuring characters from J. R. R. Tolkien’s The Lord of the Rings . One set was given to Tolkien himself, with whom Lanier corresponded. Tolkien reportedly admired the miniatures but did not want them to be marketed commercially, a wish Lanier respected.

Bibliography

Hiero Desteen 
 Hiero's Journey (Chilton, 1973) 
 The Unforsaken Hiero (1983)

Brigadier Ffellowes 
 The Peculiar Exploits of Brigadier Ffellowes (1971) [collection: contents as TPEOBF below]
 The Curious Quests of Brigadier Ffellowes (1986) [collection: contents as TCQOBF below; 1 original]

Novels
 The War for the Lot (1969)
 Menace Under Marswood (1983)

Short stories
 "Join Our Gang?" (1961)
 "Deathchild" (1968) 
 "The Kings of the Sea" (1968) [TPEOBF]
 "Soldier Key" (1968) [TPEOBF]
 "Such Stuff as Dreams" (1968)
 "Whose Short Happy Life?" (1968)
 "A Feminine Jurisdiction" (1969) [TPEOBF]
 "Fraternity Brother" (1969) [TPEOBF]
 "The Leftovers" (1969) [TPEOBF]
 "His Coat So Gay" (1970) [TPEOBF]
 "His Only Safari" (1970) [TPEOBF]
 "Never Cry Human" (1970)
 "And the Voice of the Turtle" (1972) [TCQOBF]
 "Thinking of the Unthinkable" (1973) [TCQOBF]
 "A Father's Tale" (1974) [TCQOBF]
 "No Traveler Returns" (1974)
 "Ghost of a Crown" (1976) [TCQOBF]
 "The Syndicated Time" (1978)
 "Commander in the Mist" (1982) [TCQOBF]
 "The Brigadier in Check—and Mate" (1986) [TCQOBF; original]

In popular culture 
In the videogame Elite: Dangerous, a Coriolis Starport in the Audheim system is named after Lanier, bearing the name Lanier Ring.

References

External links
 
 
 
Fantastic Fiction entry
Internet Book List entry
Obituary by Locus online
Obituary by Loren Coleman

1927 births
2007 deaths
20th-century American novelists
American fantasy writers
American male novelists
American science fiction writers
The Harvard Lampoon alumni
American male short story writers
20th-century American short story writers
20th-century American male writers
People associated with Winterthur Museum, Garden and Library